Lucas Wallmark (born 5 September 1995) is a Swedish professional ice hockey center who is currently playing for ZSC Lions of the National League (NL). He was selected by the Carolina Hurricanes in the fourth round, 97th overall, at the 2014 NHL Entry Draft.

Playing career
Wallmark made his Elitserien debut playing with Skellefteå AIK during the 2012–13 Elitserien season. He transferred to SHL rivals, Luleå HF, with which he spent three seasons the following year.

On 11 June 2015, Wallmark signed a three-year entry-level contract with the Carolina Hurricanes.

During the 2017–18 season, on 30 December 2017, Wallmark scored his first NHL goal with the Hurricanes in a game against the St. Louis Blues. He was reassigned to the Charlotte Checkers on 8 January 2018. Wallmark was named the Checkers' MVP following the team's elimination from the 2018 Calder Cup playoffs.

In the 2019–20 season, through 60 games, Wallmark established a career-high 11 goals before he was traded by the Hurricanes at the NHL trade deadline along with Erik Haula, Eetu Luostarinen and Chase Priskie to the Florida Panthers in exchange for Vincent Trocheck on 24 February 2020. He added one goal and an assist in 7 regular season games with the Panthers before the season was paused due to the COVID-19 pandemic. He returned in the qualifying rounds for the post-season, going scoreless in 2 games.

As an impending restricted free agent, Wallmark was not tendered a qualifying offer by the Panthers, ending his brief tenure with the club on 8 October 2020. As a free agent Wallmark signed a one-year, $950,000 contract with the Chicago Blackhawks on 12 October 2020.

During the pandemic delayed 2020–21 season, Wallmark struggled to find his role with the Blackhawks, posting just three assists through 16 games before he was placed on waivers and assigned to the taxi squad on 6 April 2021. Wallmark was then traded once again to the Florida Panthers on 8 April 2021, along with Lucas Carlsson in exchange for Brett Connolly, Riley Stillman, the rights to former first-round pick Henrik Borgström and a 7th-round pick in the 2021 NHL Entry Draft. Wallmark went scoreless in 4 regular season games in his return with the Panthers, remaining primarily on the club's taxi squad through the playoffs.

As an impending free agent, Wallmark left the NHL in signing a one-year contract with Russian outfit HC CSKA Moscow of the Kontinental Hockey League (KHL) on 15 June 2021. In the 2021–22 season, Wallmark seamlessly adapted to the KHL in registering eight goals and 19 points through 31 regular season games.

He made two playoff appearances before terminating his contract with CSKA on 4 March 2022 due to the Russian invasion of Ukraine.

As a free agent in the off-season, Wallmark was later signed to a three-year contract with Swiss club, ZSC Lions of the NL, on 16 May 2022.

Career statistics

Regular season and playoffs

International

References

External links

1995 births
Living people
Asplöven HC players
Carolina Hurricanes draft picks
Carolina Hurricanes players
Charlotte Checkers (2010–) players
Chicago Blackhawks players
HC CSKA Moscow players
Florida Panthers players
Karlskrona HK players
Luleå HF players
Ice hockey players at the 2022 Winter Olympics
Olympic ice hockey players of Sweden
Sportspeople from Umeå
Swedish ice hockey centres
Skellefteå AIK players
ZSC Lions players